The Maine State Police (MSP) is the state police agency for Maine, which has jurisdiction across the state. It was created in 1921 to protect the lives, property, and constitutional rights of the citizens of the state of Maine.

Vehicles

The Maine State police uses:
Ford Police Interceptor Sedan and in both marked and unmarked versions. The marked versions are a dark sky blue.  Unmarked cars are a variety of colors.
Ford Police Interceptor Utility typically marked. Most sergeants have MSP blue cruisers with no decals. Some MSP Interceptor Utilities are unmarked and in various colors, some with civilian rims and license plates.
Chevrolet Tahoe and Chevrolet Suburban Usually marked in non-traditional colors (silver, dark gray or dark blue), but do come unmarked.  Used for commercial vehicle enforcement and accident reconstruction.

From 2005 through 2015, all cars were slicktops with only interior-mounted emergency lighting. Following a motor vehicle accident in July 2015 involving a Maine State Police cruiser and a tractor trailer, the State Police shifted away from their slicktop-only fleet to using Whelen Legacy light bars. Also, new reflective fender/hood/trunk graphics with rear bumper chevrons and rear pillar reflective stripes were added to all new cars.

While most marked units have blue license plates, many detective and unmarked units have regular civilian license plates. 

Following the end of Ford Crown Victoria Police Interceptor production, the MSP recently announced that it has "all but finally settled" on the new Ford Taurus-based Interceptor. As production ends on the Taurus, the Police Interceptor Utility has become the main vehicle purchased

Training programs

Maine State Troopers go through an 18-week Basic Law Enforcement training period at the Maine Criminal Justice Academy in Vassalboro. The entrance standards to the Academy are some of the toughest in the United States. Training includes many hours of learning in courses such as firearms, Constitutional law, patrol procedures, criminal behavior, high-speed pursuit and various other criminal justice and social science courses. The training program at the MCJA is nearly as rigorous as the actual job itself, giving new recruits a good idea of the intensity of the demanding profession for which they are preparing. After graduation from the MCJA, Trooper recruits are required to attend another 10 weeks of training in the Recruit Training Troop (RTT). The RTT is even more rigorous than the 18-week Basic Law Enforcement academy.

As Troopers progress in their careers, they are able to join other specialized units, such as the Tactical Team or K9 Unit. These added units require many extra hours of training. Many State Troopers are involved in two to three extra units, depending upon where they are located.

Field Troops

Maine State Troopers patrol from ten barracks located across the state. These barracks are:

Troop A - Alfred - York County
Troop B - Gray - Southern Maine
Troop C - Skowhegan - Western Maine
Troop D - Augusta - Midcoast Maine
Troop E - Bangor - Central Maine
Troop F - Houlton - Northern Maine
Troop G - Portland - Maine Turnpike
Troop I - Maine Interstate System 
Troop J - Ellsworth - Downeast Maine
Troop K - Augusta - Commercial Vehicle Enforcement Unit 

In late 2022, the Maine State Police announced that it would be restructuring its field troops. Troops A and B combined to form the Southern Field Troop, Troops C and D formed the Central Field Troop, and Troops E and J formed the Northern Field Troop. Additionally, Troop I was established to patrol the Maine Interstate System from Augusta to the Aroostook County line.

Weapons 
Troopers are issued the Heckler & Koch HK45 LEM .45 Auto, semi automatic pistol. Detectives are authorized to use the HK 45 C LEM. Prior to the HK45 troopers were issued the Heckler & Koch USP .45 and the USP .45 Compact. Previously Troopers were issued the Beretta 92F and 92F Centurion and the Smith & Wesson Model 13 .357 Magnum revolver. Troopers are also armed with the Bushmaster XM-15, detectives are issued the Ruger PC-9, and the Springfield M14 is also issued. The M60 machine gun is used in rare cases.

Specialized units

The State Police have many specialized units. These include:

Air Wing
The Maine State Police Air Wing was established in the 1970s. Today, the air wing consists of two Cessna 182 fixed wing aircraft. The aircraft are strategically stationed for regional response to mission requests. Both aircraft and pilots are certified for IFR (instrument flight rules) flight.

The State Police Air Wing is often utilized for traffic enforcement along the interstate from Kittery to Houlton, and aerial photos of traffic crash and crime scenes. The aircraft are used to conduct searches for lost or wanted persons. They also serve as an aerial platform to support the Maine State Police Tactical and Canine Teams, and conduct administrative transports throughout New England.

The Maine State Police responsible for air search and rescue efforts. In this role, air wing personnel assist incident commanders in coordinating search efforts for lost or overdue aircraft reported within the state.

Bombs/Explosives Unit

The bomb team has been active since 1994 and is made up of five bomb technicians who have been specially trained. The team is responsible for investigating actual or suspected explosive devices. Utilizing federal funding, the team obtained a containment trailer for explosives and a remote control robot, which is used to examine suspicious packages.

K9 Unit

The Maine State Police Canine Unit is composed of twenty certified teams. The unit is split into two separate but interrelated functions: operational and training. A sergeant and one full-time trooper staff the unit. The K-9 Training Center is located adjacent to the Maine Criminal Justice Academy, in Vassalboro, Maine. From this location we are able to provide support for our operational missions, both in terms of logistical support and equipment needs.

Calls for service include tracking lost persons or persons suspected of committing a crime. Searching for discarded evidence, both known and unknown. Searching for suspects concealed in buildings. Locating prohibited narcotics hidden in vehicles, structures and on persons. Searching for explosives. Explosive searches are split between actual calls for suspected devices and precautionary searches for dignitaries and VIP's. Patrol dogs also provide protection for their handlers and deterring ongoing criminal behavior.

Crisis Negotiations Unit

This specially trained group of thirteen negotiators responds to life-threatening incidents such as suicidal threats, barricaded persons and hostage takers. Their goal is to open a line of communication aimed at resolving the situation in a nonviolent manner. The team works in conjunction with the tactical team and responds to most of their calls.

Dive Team

The dive team consists of ten members, eight from State Police and two divers from the Maine Marine Patrol. The team conducts searches for evidence in criminal investigations. They also conduct underwater crime scene documentation and investigation. The team also conducts search and recovery operations for victims of motor vehicle crashes, homicide, and other water related deaths. The team is often called upon to search vessels and harbors in Maine as part of Homeland Security.

Evidence Response Team

The Evidence Response Team examines major scenes to identify and establish the interrelationships of physical evidence involved in the scene. This process involves developing, identifying, documenting, collecting, and preserving evidence for purposes of identifying suspects and establishing sequence of events possibilities.

The ERT is composed of 29 sworn members who are all IAI certified Scene Technicians and Analysts. These members may have individual forensic specialties but are all generalists that maintain a good working knowledge of the various disciplines of forensic science.

There are 20 additional ERT Associate Members that represent an expertise in a broad spectrum of forensic disciplines (i.e. pathology, trace, biology, prints, ballistics, anthropology, etc.) and act as consultants who train regularly with the team.

Executive Protection

The Executive Protection Unit is assigned to protect the Governor, the Governor's family, and anyone else as designated by the Governor or the Department.  Members of the EPU are trained in personal protection, physical security, and threat assessment.  The EPU works closely with other state, local, and federal agencies to provide protection for the Governor and other visiting dignitaries.

Criminal Investigations and Forensics

The Maine State Police maintains a full service nationally accredited crime laboratory.  There are three divisions of criminal investigators, a polygraph unit, a computer crimes unit and intelligence unit.  The Maine State Police also play a key role in the homeland security issues in Maine.  The Maine State Police/State Bureau of Identification maintains all criminal records and statistics in the State as well as the Sex Offender Registry.

Motor vehicle inspection program

Maine requires all motor vehicles to undergo a safety inspection once a year. Vehicles registered in Cumberland County are also required to undergo an emissions test. Inspections are conducted at automobile dealerships, service stations and garages. To insure inspection mechanics are complying with the state's many safety provisions, motor vehicle inspectors conduct periodic reviews of their practices and facilities, and investigate complaints. In addition, state police personnel inspect Maine's school bus fleet at least once per year. This is in addition to the two regular annual inspections required of school buses. There are about 8,000 active licensed inspection mechanics and 2,700 inspection stations. One motor vehicle inspector, eight motor vehicle inspectors, and two clerks currently staff the program.

Motor Vehicle Crash Investigation Program

The State of Maine Crash Reconstruction Unit is composed of State Police, Municipal and County Law Enforcement personnel. Currently the unit includes 20 troopers, 15 county and 37 municipal officers. Unit members are located throughout the entire state and are chosen based on both geographic location and ability.

The objective of the Crash Reconstruction Unit is to conduct in-depth investigations and analyses of major traffic collisions throughout the state. Investigations include the reconstruction of a crash and a study of the factors that may have contributed to that crash. These factors include environmental, human and mechanical and are associated with the three phases of a collision, which are pre-crash, at-crash and post-crash. The ultimate objective of the program is the utilization of these identified causation factors to prevent collisions of a similar nature from recurring.

Unit members are trained in the physics of collision analysis and reconstruction, occupant kinematics (human factor analysis), vehicle dynamics (collision damage analysis), scene photography, the use of various measuring instruments and computer-aided design software.

Tactical Team

The Maine State Police Tactical Team was formed in 1982. The unit consisted of a handful of State Troopers armed with limited equipment and provided support to law enforcement agencies throughout the State of Maine.

Presently, the Tactical Team consists of 23 members, counting the Team Leaders. These Troopers, Detectives and Sergeants have primary responsibilities in a Troop or other unit within the Maine State Police agency. The Tactical Team is a secondary function, which defines the unit as a collateral duty Team. The current Team has 19 Tactical operators, two Tactical K9 units and two Tactical Medics. The members are geographically located throughout the state, providing assistance/support to requesting law enforcement agencies, including the State Police. Each member on the Team is cross-trained with all equipment.

The Tactical Team works in conjunction with the Maine State Police Crisis Negotiation Team to peacefully resolve critical incidents, which include barricaded subjects, wanted felons, high-risk K-9 tracks, hostage situations and high-risk warrant services. Over the past few years, the Tactical Team has responded to approximately 50 calls for service per year.

In addition, the Tactical Team instructs students at the Maine Criminal Justice Academy, provides support to Federal agencies for Homeland Security issues and works in conjunction with other local, state and county law enforcement agencies.

Chief of State Police

On Monday April 11, 2011, Governor Paul LePage nominated Lieutenant Colonel Robert Williams to be the new police chief.

In May 2011, Robert Williams was named Colonel of the Maine State Police.

In March 2018, Colonel Robert Williams announced his retirement from the Maine State Police, stating that he had accepted a position with Colby College as their Director of Security. Governor LePage nominated Lieutenant Colonel John Cote to be the next State Police Chief.

In December 2022, Governor Janet Mills nominated Major William Ross to be the next Chief of the Maine State Police.

Fallen officers
Since the establishment of the Maine State Police, 12 officers have died while on duty.

Rank structure

See also

 Highway patrol
 State police
 List of law enforcement agencies in Maine

References

External links
Maine State Police Website https://www.maine.gov/dps/msp/

State law enforcement agencies of Maine
Government agencies established in 1921
1921 establishments in Maine